Rahmati is a Persian surname that may refer to
Amir Rahmati (born 1989), Iranian academic 
Bashir Ahmad Rahmati (born 1985), Afghan wrestler 
Kianoush Rahmati (born 1978), Iranian football player and coach
Mahmoud Ghaed Rahmati (born 1991), Iranian football midfielder
Mehdi Rahmati (born 1983), Iranian football goalkeeper 
Mohammad Alipour Rahmati (born 1962), Iranian politician 
Mohammad Rahmati Sirjani (born 1928), Iranian Twelver 
Nader Rahmati (born 1966), Iranian wrestler
Sayed Anwar Rahmati, Afghan politician

See also
Ramati

Arabic-language surnames